Leukotriene A4 synthase may refer to:

 Arachidonate 5-lipoxygenase, an enzyme
 Arachidonate 12-lipoxygenase, an enzyme